Jerry Pye is a Canadian politician and member of the Nova Scotia House of Assembly, representing the riding of Dartmouth North for the Nova Scotia New Democratic Party. He was first elected in the 1998 election, and was re-elected in 1999 and 2003.

Pye chose not to run for re-election in the 2006 election, leaving politics. His successor, Trevor Zinck, won the election.

Pye reentered politics in September 2012, running for District 6 Councillor in the Halifax Regional Municipality municipal election.

His son, Brad Pye, was the NDP candidate in Dartmouth—Cole Harbour in the 40th Canadian federal election.

References

Nova Scotia New Democratic Party MLAs
Living people
People from Dartmouth, Nova Scotia
21st-century Canadian politicians
1947 births